Single non-transferable vote or SNTV is an electoral system used to elect multiple winners. It is a generalization of first-past-the-post, applied to multi-member districts with each voter casting just one vote. Unlike FPTP, which is a single-winner system, in SNTV multiple winners are elected, typically in electoral districts; additionally, unlike FPTP, SNTV produces mixed representation and makes it unlikely for a single party to take all the seats in a city or a province, which can happen under FPTP.

Unlike block voting or limited voting, where each voter casts multiple votes (multiple non-transferable vote (MNTV)), under SNTV each voter casts just one vote. This usually produces semi-proportional representation at the district level, meaning small parties, as well as large parties, have a chance to be represented. Single transferable vote (STV) is a more proportional alternative to SNTV. Under STV, ranked voting allows unused votes (placed on winners or losers) to be transferred to other candidates.

Voting
In any election, each voter casts one vote for one candidate in a multi-candidate race for multiple offices. Posts are filled by the candidates with the most votes (plurality voting). Thus, in a three-seat constituency, the three candidates receiving the largest numbers of votes would win office.

SNTV, like single transferable vote, can be used with non-partisan ballots.

Example
Three seats are to be filled among five candidates: A, B, C, D and E fielded by 3 parties X, Y and Z.

C, D and E are the winning candidates.
Thus, Party Z gets two seats and Party Y gets one seat. No one party took all the seats as might have been the result under first past the post or plurality block voting.

But counting the votes by party gives these vote tallies:

Party Y has more votes than Party Z, but receives fewer seats because of an inefficient spread of votes across the candidates. If Party Y's two candidates had had more equal vote tallies, it would have won two seats and Party Z only one. Or if Party Z's candidates had received less equal vote tallies, Party Y would have won two seats even if its candidates were not equally popular. (There is more chance in SNTV than a more orderly system of PR.)

If either party had risked trying to win all three seats, causing more vote splitting among supporters of Parties Y and Z, then A of Party X might have won a seat and either party Y or Z would then have taken one fewer seat.

Comparison to MNTV 
Candidates are running in a 3-member district of 10000 voters. Under non-transferable (and non-cumulative) voting, voters may not cast a more than one vote for a single candidate.

 Under (plurality) block voting, the standard multiple non-transferable vote, voters may cast 3 votes (but do not have to)
 Under limited (block) voting, voters may cast 2 votes maximum.
 Under the single non-transferable vote, voters may cast 1 vote.

Party A has about 35% support among the electorate (with one particularly well-like candidate), Party B around 25% (with two well-like candidates) and the remaining voters primarily support independent candidates, but mostly lean towards party B if they have to choose between the two parties. All voters vote sincerely; there is no tactical voting.

 Under the single non-transferable vote (not a type of approval voting), the three most popular candidates according to voters first preferences are elected, regardless of party affiliation.
 Under limited voting, it is most likely that the party with a plurality takes two seats (the number of votes each voter has), and the minority party receives the remaining seats.
 Under (plurality) block voting, the party with plurality support most likely wins all seats.

Proportional representation
SNTV facilitates minority representation, that is, it produces mixed representation of large and small parties where no party takes all the seats.

In fact, SNTV would elect the same people as are elected in STV contests where the vote transfers do not move an initially-lower-placing candidate over an initially-higher-placing one. It is common for STV vote transfers to elect the same as would be elected under SNTV. But not having transfers, SNTV sees more votes wasted than under STV due to the votes placed on un-electable candidate or in surpluses received by successful candidate over and above the quota used in STV elections and not being able to be transferred.

SNTV produces representation that is most proportional (proportional representation) when political parties have accurate information about their relative levels of electoral support, and nominate candidates in accordance with their respective levels of electoral support or when all parties suffer from poor information of that sort. Knowing the portion of the votes a party can take allows it to avoid vote waste due to  lessening the chance of vote splitting and inefficient placement of party support. Under 'perfect' tactical voting and strategic nomination, SNTV would be equivalent to the D'Hondt (Jefferson) method of proportional representation.

But under SNTV even inefficient distribution of votes allows more balanced representation than would be elected under either single-member plurality or Block voting.

But as SNTV is a plurality system, it is possible to win with less than that quota. To determine the successful candidates, candidates' vote tallies are compared with the vote tallies of others.

Vote spitting due to poor information on voters behaviour may deny a popular party its due share of representation. (Single Transferable Voting does not suffer from this handicap as votes are transferable and many are transferred and used that are wasted under SNTV.)  Parties organizing slates of multiple candidates may nominate many candidates and then learn on election night that the party was not as popular as they thought.

If every party does that, all suffer the same inefficiency and the final result is proportional. If one party is more prudent, it may do better than the others. Because votes cannot be transferred, there is more chance of vote wastage than under STV.

But in elections that use SNTV, representation is usually mixed. It is rare for one party to make a sweep of a city's seats, a thing common in First past the post elections. The number of wasted votes in an SNTV election is generally lower than in First past the post elections as well.

Under SNTV, parties often do not receive representation exactly proportional to their strength, because it is difficult to accurately judge their strength when deciding how many candidates to field (strategic nomination) and difficult to direct party supporters as a whole to spread their votes efficiently. If they field too many, supporters' votes might be split across too many candidates. The party votes might spread their vote numbers to the point where all of a party's candidates lose to a less thinly spread opposing party.

If a party fields too few candidates, they might elect all their candidates but not win seats proportional to their level of support, and the winning candidates would have more support than necessary and thus wasting votes.

The risks of poor strategic nomination are not equal for parties of various strengths. A large party would have much more to lose from the split vote effect than to gain from avoiding the wasted vote effect, and so would likely decide to err on the side of fielding fewer candidates (but probably not less than their existing number of seats). A small party with little representation would be more risk-tolerant and err on the side of too many candidates, hoping to gain as many seats as possible, perhaps even winning more than its proportion of the electorate if they can edge out candidates from larger parties with just a few votes. As well, a small party running just one candidate would not suffer from vote spitting, while a larger party running four or more may suffer from that.

SNTV electoral systems, like STV and proportional electoral systems generally, typically produce more proportional electoral outcomes as the size of the electoral districts (number of seats in each constituency) increases.

Potential for tactical voting
The potential for tactical voting in a single non-transferable vote system is large. Casting only one vote, a rational voter wanting to maximize the number of seats captured by his party should vote for a candidate of the party that has a chance of winning, but one that will not win by too great a margin and thus take votes away from party colleagues. This creates opportunities for tactical nominations, with parties nominating candidates similar to their opponents' candidates in order to split the vote. Like all multiple-winner selections, parties find it advantageous to run a range of candidates in SNTV elections.

SNTV has been measured through the lens of such concepts as decision-theoretic analysis. Professor Gary W. Cox, an expert on SNTV, has studied this system's use in Japan. Cox has an explanation of real-world data finding the, "two systems [plurality and semi-proportional] are alike in their strategic voting equilibria." His research found that voters use the information offered in campaigns (polls, reporting, fundraising totals, endorsements, etc.), to rationally decide who the most viable candidates are and then vote for them.

SNTV can result in complicated intra-party dynamics because in a SNTV system, a candidate runs against candidates from their own party as well as against candidates from the other party. SNTV elections are not zero-sum contests. Just because one particular candidate is elected does not mean that another specific candidate will not be. They both can be elected.

Because running on issues may lead to a situation in which a candidate becomes too popular and therefore draws votes away from other allied candidates, SNTV may encourage legislators to join factions that consist of patron-client relationships in which a powerful legislator can apportion votes to his or her supporters.

In addition, parties will do best if their supporters evenly distribute their votes among the party's candidates. Historically, in Taiwan, the Kuomintang did this by sending members a letter telling them which candidate to vote for. With the Democratic Progressive Party, vote sharing is done informally, as members of a family or small group will coordinate their votes. The New Party had a surprisingly effective system by asking party supporters to vote for the candidate that corresponded to their birthdate. This led to a system of vote allocation which had been adopted by all parties for the 2004 ROC legislative elections.

History
Single Non-transferable Voting first proposed in solid form by Saint-Just in 1793 in a proposal to the French National Convention. He proposed having the whole country as one multi-seat district. It was not adopted in France at that time.

Japan was the first country to adopt SNTV for election of government members a hundred years later than Saint-Just's proposal. In 1880s Japan adopted SNTV for provincial politicians and in 1900 for national politicians.

Usage
SNTV is used for elections in Puerto Rico, Kuwait, Indonesia, Japan, Taiwan, Thailand, Libya, Iraq, Hong Kong and Vanuatu.

Puerto Rico
In Puerto Rico, where SNTV is known as at-large representation ("representación por acumulación" in Spanish), political parties vary the ballot order of their candidates across electoral divisions, in order to ensure each candidate has a roughly equal chance of success. Since most voters choose the candidates placed at the top of their party lists on their ballots, at-large candidates from the same party usually obtain approximately equal vote totals.

The two major Puerto Rican political parties, the Popular Democratic Party and the New Progressive Party, usually nominate six candidates for each chamber, while the much smaller Puerto Rican Independence Party runs single-candidate slates for both the Senate and the House of Representatives. The overall distribution of legislative seats is largely determined by the results for the sixteen Senate and forty House district seats, elected by plurality voting.

Japan, South Korea and Taiwan
SNTV was once used to elect the legislatures of Japan, South Korea and the Republic of China (Taiwan), but its use has been discontinued for the most part. It is still used in Japan for some seats in the House of Councillors (Sangi-in), prefectural assemblies and municipal assemblies.

In Taiwan it is used for the six aboriginal seats in the Legislative Yuan (national legislature), as well as local assemblies. The party structure there was complicated by the fact that while members of the Legislative Yuan were elected by SNTV, executive positions were (and still are) elected by a first past the post. This created a party system in which smaller factionalized parties, which SNTV promotes, have formed two large coalitions that resembles the two party system which first past the post rewards. Starting with the 2008 legislative elections, SNTV was discarded in favor of a mixed single member district (SMD) with proportional representation based on national party votes, similar to Japan. This system was a legacy of its colonial rule inherited from the Meiji Constitution.

Hong Kong
From 1997 to 2016, the electoral system for up to half of the seats of the Legislative Council of the territory was nominally a party-list proportional representation system with Hare quota. In practice, political parties fielded multiple lists in the same constituency. For example, the Democratic Party fielded three separate lists in the eight-seat New Territories West constituency in the 2008 election, aiming to win three seats (they won two). Split list or split tickets is done in order to win more seats with fewer votes, since the first candidate on each list would require less than the Hare quota to get a seat. Supporters are asked to split their votes among the lists of the same party, usually along geographical location of residence. In the 2012 and 2016 elections, no candidate list won more than one seat in any of the six PR constituencies which returned a total of 40 seats, rendering the result effectively the same as SNTV.

In the 2021 Hong Kong electoral reform, the Standing Committee of the National People's Congress instituted SNTV in its amendment to Annex 2 of the Basic Law on 30 March 2021. 20 seats of the Legislative Council are returned by geographical constituencies (GC) through single non-transferable vote with a district magnitude of 2. Effect of the district size of 2 under SNTV system in Hong Kong have been compared to that of the binomial voting system.

Libya
In accordance with its post-Gadaffi electoral law, Libya in 2012 elected 80 members of its 200-seat General National Congress using single non-transferable vote. Some commentators cited the system as a factor in the subsequent return to civil war in 2014.

Chile
After the 2015 electoral reform, Chileans elect their representatives to both houses of Congress through open lists presented by parties or party coalitions in each of the electoral districts into which the country is divided for the contest, allowing only one vote for one of the candidates inside any list. Once the voting is over, the distribution of seats in each district (which can range from 3 to 8 in the lower house and from 2 to 5 in the upper one) is carried out through the D'Hondt method, ordering the lists from highest to lowest according to the total vote of each one and the candidates within each one of them with the same principle.

Jordan
SNTV was used in Jordan from 1993 to 2016. SNTV became the official electoral system for legislature elections in Jordan in 1993, the second election since the country's return to an elected parliament in 1989. The 1993 electoral reform introduced SNTV as the "one-man, one-vote", which was argued to be a more egalitarian alternative to the former "block vote" (or Multiple non-transferable vote) where constituents could cast as many votes as there were seats in their constituency. (Under SNTV, each voter cast just one.) The Jordanian opposition parties were heavily critical of the voting reform as it significantly hurt their electoral results. The Islamic Action Front was at the forefront of this criticism, boycotting 4 of the 6 elections held under this system. The last election held purely under this system was in 2010, whose parliament was dissolved after the Arab Spring protests in Jordan and a new election was held in 2013 using both SNTV and a national closed list with a proportional system. SNTV was completely abolished after the 2016 electoral reform where it was replaced with open list PR (in 23 constituencies of between three and nine seats each) plus 15 seats reserved for women.

Kuwait
Kuwait has used SNTV to elect the members of its National Assembly (Majles al-Umma) in five 10-member districts, starting with the 2012 election.

Vanuatu
Since independence from Britain and France in 1980, Vanuatu has used SNTV to elect most of the members of its Parliament. Currently, other than eight members elected in single-member constituencies, the 52 members of Parliament are elected in ten multi-member constituencies (of between two and seven seats) by single non-transferable vote. The last election this was done was the 2020 Vanuatuan general election.

See also
Single transferable vote
Plurality-at-large voting (multiple non-transferable vote (MNTV))
Runoff voting

References

External links
A Handbook of Electoral System Design from International IDEA
ACE Project—Expert site providing encyclopedia on Electoral Systems and Management, country by country data, a library of electoral materials, latest election news, the opportunity to submit questions to a network of electoral experts, and a forum to discuss all of the above
Electoral Design Reference Materials from the ACE Project

Semi-proportional electoral systems
Multi-winner electoral systems